Uncle Sam (born Sam Turner; May 31, 1971 in Detroit, Michigan, United States) is an American R&B singer. He is best known for being signed to Boyz II Men's Stonecreek Records imprint (distributed by Epic Records) in the late 1990s.

His only Top 40 hit was the Nathan Morris-penned "I Don't Ever Want to See You Again" released October 14, 1997, which reached No. 6 on the US Billboard Hot 100 chart, and No. 2 on the US R&B chart in 1997. The same track reached No. 30 in the UK Singles Chart in May 1998.  The record sold over one million copies, gaining gold disc status.

Uncle Sam also sang a cover of "When I See You Smile", originally recorded by Bad English, for the television program, Touched by an Angel.

Uncle Sam performed a live global stream in Nairobi, Kenya on February 18, 2017, following the final bout of the Making of a Champ boxing series.  His set included:
 "Free"
 "When I See You Smile"
 "You" (pre-release debut of new single)
 "I Don't Ever Want to See You Again"

Discography

Albums

Charted singles

References

Living people
Singers from Detroit
1971 births
21st-century African-American male singers
20th-century African-American male singers